The 2nd FINA Synchronised Swimming World Trophy was held 2007 in Rio de Janeiro, Brazil. It featured swimmers from 8 nations, swimming in three events: Duet, Team and Free Combination.

Participating nations
8 nations swam at the 2007 Synchro World Trophy:

Results

Final standings

References

FINA Synchronized Swimming World Trophy
2007 in synchronized swimming
International aquatics competitions hosted by Brazil
2007 in Brazilian sport
Synchronized swimming competitions in Brazil